The Man Who Fell to Earth is an American science fiction drama television series created by Jenny Lumet and Alex Kurtzman based on the 1963 novel of the same name by Walter Tevis. It is a sequel to the 1976 film starring David Bowie. The series stars Chiwetel Ejiofor as an alien who arrives on planet Earth and Bill Nighy, playing the role originally played by Bowie in the 1976 film. It debuted on Showtime on April 24, 2022. A portion of the series was shown at SXSW on March 12, 2022. In October 2022, the series was not renewed for a second season.

Premise
The future of the planet is in the hands of an alien who arrives on Earth at a pivotal moment in history.

Cast

Main
 Chiwetel Ejiofor as Faraday
 Naomie Harris as Justin Falls
 Annelle Olaleye as Molly Falls
 Clarke Peters as Josiah Falls
 Bill Nighy as Thomas Jerome Newton
 Jimmi Simpson as Spencer Clay
 Kate Mulgrew as Drew Finch
 Sonya Cassidy as Edie Flood
 Joana Ribeiro as Lisa Dominguez
 Rob Delaney as Hatch Flood

Recurring
 Tanya Moodie as Portia
 Juliet Stevenson as Sister Mary Lou Prescott
 Art Malik as Henning Khan
 Josh Herdman as Terry Mannch
 Laurie Kynaston as Clive Flood

Guest
 Martha Plimpton as Officer K. Faraday
 Zoë Wanamaker as Watt
 Victoria Smurfit as Penny Morgan

Episodes
Each episode is named after a David Bowie song.

Production
A television adaptation of Walter Tevis's novel The Man Who Fell to Earth, moved from Hulu to CBS All Access in August 2019. It was created by Jenny Lumet and Alex Kurtzman. It had been in development at Hulu for over a year, and was moved as a result of the acquisition of 21st Century Fox by Disney, as disagreements over co-production could not be resolved.

In February 2021, Chiwetel Ejiofor was cast to star in the series, playing the role of the alien/Faraday. The next month, the series moved to Showtime, with Naomie Harris, Jimmi Simpson and Clarke Peters added to the cast. Rob Delaney, Sonya Cassidy, Joana Ribeiro, and Annelle Olayele would join in April. In August, Kate Mulgrew joined in a recurring role. In January 2022, Bill Nighy was cast to play Thomas Jerome Newton, the role David Bowie played in the film. In October 2022, it was reported that Showtime would not renew the series for a second season.

Filming began on May 3, 2021, in London.

Release
The series was initially planned for a 2021 release on Paramount+. It premiered on April 24, 2022 on Showtime and on Paramount+ internationally.

Reception

Critical response
The review aggregator website Rotten Tomatoes reported a 86% approval rating with an average rating of 6.7/10, based on 29 critic reviews. The website's critics consensus reads, "The Man Who Fell to Earth may not be out of this world, but a commanding Chiwetel Ejiofor gives this space oddity an earthy gravitas." Metacritic, which uses a weighted average, assigned a score of 68 out of 100 based on 16 critics, indicating "generally favorable reviews".

Ratings

Awards and nominations

References

External links
 

2022 American television series debuts
2022 American television series endings
2020s American drama television series
2020s American science fiction television series
English-language television shows
Showtime (TV network) original programming
Television series about alien visitations
Television series by CBS Studios
Television series by StudioCanal
Television series created by Alex Kurtzman
Television shows based on American novels
Television shows shot in London
Patricide in fiction